The 2020–21 LEN Euro League Women was the 34th edition of the major competition for European women's water polo clubs. It is started on 2 February 2021 and it ended with the Final 4 on 30 April and 1 May 2021.

Schedule
The schedule of the competition is as follows.

Qualification round
The qualification round is scheduled for 5–7 February 2021.

Group A

Group B

Group C

Group D

Knockout phase

Quarter-finals

Final four

References

Notes

External links
, len.microplustiming.com

LEN Euro League Women seasons
Women's Champions League
2020 in water polo
2021 in water polo
LEN Champions League